The 2019 Nevada Wolf Pack football team represented the University of Nevada, Reno in the 2019 NCAA Division I FBS football season. The Wolf Pack were led by third–year head coach Jay Norvell and played their home games at Mackay Stadium. They were members of the West Division of the Mountain West Conference. They finished the season 7–6 and 4–4 in Mountain West play to finish in third place in the West division.

Coaching changes
Jeff Casteel was relieved of his duties as defensive coordinator. Former Sacramento State head coach Jody Sears took over as Wolf Pack's Defensive Coordinator for the bowl game. Norvell said "Jeff, David and Mike have made significant contributions to our program and I'm appreciative of their efforts with the Wolf Pack, We are moving forward in a new direction, and we are preparing for the bowl game at this time." and Norvell again said "We're excited to have these high quality coaches with us as we prepare for a really good Ohio team in the Famous Idaho Potato Bowl, With the early signing period behind us, our sole purpose is to prepare our players to win the bowl game. We will focus on filling permanent additions to the staff in January. Probably the most important thing is getting the right coaches here for the long term, I'm not going to hurry through that process. I'm going to take my time. I'm going to talk to everybody I know. We'll talk to college coaches, professional coaches, everybody that I respect we'll get information from and we'll make sure we have the right people who have the qualities that we need to take the next step."

Preseason

Award watch lists

Mountain West media days
The Mountain West media days were held on July 23–24, 2019, at Green Valley Ranch in Henderson, Nevada.

Media poll
The preseason poll was released on July 23, 2019. The Wolf Pack were predicted to finish in third place in the MW West Division.

Preseason All–Mountain West Team
The Wolf Pack had two players selected to the preseason All–Mountain West Team; two from the offense.

Offense

Toa Taua – RB

Jake Nelson – OL

Schedule

Personnel

Game summaries

Purdue

at Oregon

Weber State

at UTEP

Hawaii

San Jose State

at Utah State

at Wyoming

New Mexico

at San Diego State

at Fresno State

UNLV

vs. Ohio (Famous Idaho Potato Bowl)

References

Nevada
Nevada Wolf Pack football seasons
Nevada Wolf Pack football